Tender Heart may refer to:
 Tender Heart (Lionel Richie song)
 Tender Heart (Trancylvania song)